The 27th People's Choice Awards, honoring the best in popular culture for 2000, were held on January 7, 2001, at the Shrine Auditorium in Los Angeles, California. They were hosted by Kevin James, and broadcast on CBS.

Awards
Winners are listed first, in bold.

References

External links
2001 People's Choice Awards at People's Choice Awards

People's Choice Awards
2001 awards in the United States
2001 in Los Angeles
January 2001 events in the United States